Cryptandra connata is a species of flowering plant in the family Rhamnaceae and is endemic to inland Western Australia. It is an erect, prickly shrub with linear to lance-shaped leaves and clusters of white, pink or purple, tube-shaped flowers.

Description
The leaves are variable in size and shape, mostly small and linear to lance-shaped with the edges rolled under. The flowers are glabrous, white, pink or purple, and more or less sessile. The floral tube has 5 to 16 overlapping bracts at the base and the sepals are hairy near their tips.

Taxonomy and naming
Cryptandra connata was first formally described in 1929 by Charles Gardner and the description was published in the Journal of the Royal Society of Western Australia. The specific epithet (connata) means "joined together", referring to the sepal lobes.

Distribution and habitat
This cryptandra grows on sandplains in the Coolgardie and  Murchison bioregions of inland Western Australia.

Conservation status
This cryptandra is listed as "not threatened" by the Government of Western Australia Department of Biodiversity, Conservation and Attractions.

References

connata
Rosales of Australia
Flora of Western Australia
Plants described in 1929
Taxa named by Charles Gardner